Rimil Buriuly (born 9 January 1991) is an Indian sportswoman who competes in archery. Rimil was part of bronze winning team in Women's Recurve event at the 2010 Asian Games held in Guangzhou, China between 12 and 27 November 2010. Rimil is employed in Indian Railways in Bilaspur, Chhattisgarh. She has also won the silver medal at world championships in the team event in 2015 at Copenhagen, Denmark.

Career 
Rimil has won several medals at Youth and senior level events. Rimil will represent India in Rio Olympics, 2016.

References

1991 births
Living people
Indian female archers
Archers from Jharkhand
Sportswomen from Jharkhand
Asian Games medalists in archery
Archers at the 2010 Asian Games
Asian Games bronze medalists for India
21st-century Indian women
21st-century Indian people
Medalists at the 2010 Asian Games